Magnus Kesster (29 July 1901 – 15 April 1975) was a Swedish film actor. He appeared in 80 films between 1937 and 1957.

Selected filmography

 The Pale Count (1937)
 Happy Vestköping (1937)
 A Cruise in the Albertina (1938)
 The Great Love (1938)
 A Woman's Face (1938)
 Good Friends and Faithful Neighbours (1938)
 Whalers (1939)
 Between Us Barons (1939)
 Wanted (1939)
 Only One Night (1939)
 Goransson's Boy (1941)
 Dunungen (1941)
 The Poor Millionaire (1941)
 There's a Fire Burning (1943)
 A Girl for Me (1943)
 The Green Lift (1944)
 His Excellency (1944)
 His Majesty Must Wait (1945)
 Crime and Punishment (1945)
 Iris and the Lieutenant (1946)
 It Rains on Our Love (1946)
 Incorrigible (1946)
 When the Meadows Blossom (1946)
 Kristin Commands (1946)
 Dynamite (1947)
 I Love You Karlsson (1947)
 On These Shoulders (1948)
 Loffe the Tramp (1948)
 Vagabond Blacksmiths (1949)
 Woman in White (1949)
 Son of the Sea (1949)
 The Swedish Horseman (1949)
 Two Stories Up (1950)
 Andersson's Kalle (1950)
 Teacher's First Born (1950)
 The Kiss on the Cruise (1950)
 Perhaps a Gentleman (1950)
 Skipper in Stormy Weather (1951)
 In the Arms of the Sea (1951)
 The Clang of the Pick (1952)
 Say It with Flowers (1952)
 The Beat of Wings in the Night (1953)
 A Night in the Archipelago (1953)
 Enchanted Walk (1954)
 Simon the Sinner (1954)
 Young Summer (1954)
 The Girl in Tails (1956)

References

External links

1901 births
1975 deaths
Swedish male film actors
Male actors from Stockholm
20th-century Swedish male actors